Benjamin Lauth (born 4 August 1981) is a German former professional footballer who played as a striker. He is most commonly known for his two spells at TSV 1860 Munich.

At international level, he represented Germany at under-18 and under-21 youth levels. Playing for the senior national team, he earned five caps scoring three goals.

Club career

1860 Munich
Born in Hausham, Bavaria, Lauth began his career with TSV 1860 Munich in 1992, where he had played in his youth years. He gradually established himself as their leading striker. In 2002, he scored the German Goal of the Year with a bicycle kick.

Hamburger SV
In 2004, 1860 Munich was relegated, and he moved to Hamburger SV. However, his progress was hampered by a string of nagging injuries, limiting him to only ten appearances in the 2004–05 season. However, he regained his form and earned himself a starting place in the HSV attack for much of the 2005–06 season.

VfB Stuttgart (loan)
On 25 January 2007, Lauth was loaned to VfB Stuttgart, playing his first Bundesliga game against Arminia Bielefeld on 30 January. That season Stuttgart went on to win the Bundesliga, earning Lauth a medal.

Hannover 96
On 3 July 2007, he moved to Hannover 96. At Hannover he played the last 21 of his 140 German top-flight matches.

Return to 1860 Munich
In July 2008, he returned to 1860 Munich.

In December 2012, the German Football Association suspended Lauth for four matches after ruling he had elbowed Marcel Reichwein of VfR Aalen in a 1–1 draw on 30 November.

In April 2014, 1860 Munich decided not to renew his contract. His final goal came against VfL Bochum on 4 May 2014.

In September 2015, Lauth announced his retirement.

International career
Lauth scored one goal in one appearance for the Germany under-18 youth team. For the Germany under-21s, he scored four goals in eight matches.

He made his senior international debut for Germany on 16 December 2002, in a charity match between the national team and a selection of foreign players of the Bundesliga. He scored twice in the 4–2 win. In total, he earned five caps but did not score for "the Mannschaft".

Personal life
Lauth is subject of the song Lauth anhören (a pun of laut anhören, listen loudly) by Sportfreunde Stiller, who are avid Bavarian football fans. Lauth was talented for tennis and skiing, at a young age he was offered the opportunity to go the young German academy for skiing.

Career statistics

Honours
Hamburger SV
 UEFA Intertoto Cup: 2005

VfB Stuttgart
 Bundesliga: 2006–07
 DFB-Pokal runner-up: 2006–07

Ferencváros
 Hungarian Cup: 2014–15
 Hungarian League Cup: 2014–15

Individual
 Goal of the Year (Germany): 2002

References

External links
 
 
 

1981 births
People from Miesbach (district)
Sportspeople from Upper Bavaria
Living people
Association football forwards
German footballers
Germany international footballers
Germany under-21 international footballers
TSV 1860 Munich players
TSV 1860 Munich II players
Hamburger SV players
VfB Stuttgart players
Hannover 96 players
Ferencvárosi TC footballers
Bundesliga players
2. Bundesliga players
Nemzeti Bajnokság I players
German expatriate footballers
Expatriate footballers in Hungary
German expatriate sportspeople in Hungary
Footballers from Bavaria